A coup de grâce ('blow of mercy') is a death blow to end the suffering of a severely wounded person or animal. It may be a mercy killing of mortally wounded civilians or soldiers, friends or enemies, with or without the sufferer's consent.

Methods
Examples of coup de grâce include shooting the heart or head (typically the back of the skull) of a wounded, but still living, person during an execution or by humanely killing a suffering, mortally wounded soldier, in war, for whom medical aid is not available. In pre-firearms eras the wounded were finished with edged or impact weapons to include cutting throats, blows to the head, and thrusts to the heart. Other examples include the officer leading a firing squad administering a coup de grâce to the condemned with a pistol if the first hail of gunfire fails to kill the prisoner; or a kaishakunin who performs a beheading to quickly end a samurai's agony after seppuku.

Other uses
The phrase may also refer to the final event that causes a figurative death: "The business had been struggling for years. The sharp jump in oil prices was the coup de grâce."

See also
Euthanasia
Animal euthanasia
Misericorde
Mozambique Drill

References

External links

Euthanasia